Michael Garrison is the former president of West Virginia University, succeeded by C. Peter Magrath on August 1, 2008.  A graduate of the WVU class of 1992 and earned a J.D. at WVU in 1996 after attending St. Anne's College, Oxford University on a Rotary Scholarship.  He lectured as an adjunct professor in West Virginia University's department of Political Science in the years preceding his appointment as president.  Garrison had been managing member of Spilman Thomas & Battle pllc in Morgantown.  In 2003, Garrison was awarded a Toll Fellowship from the Council of State Governments  following his tenure as Chief of Staff to West Virginia Governor Bob Wise from 2001-2003.   He served as Cabinet Secretary in the West Virginia Department of Tax and Revenue until 2001.  In 2007, Garrison was selected as West Virginia University's twenty-second president.

Garrison's selection as president was controversial with some on the university's faculty; the faculty senate voted no confidence in him in April 2007.  The Pittsburgh Post-Gazette noted concerns about his lack of academic experience and the possibility that his inclusion among the finalists was the result of his political connections.

In 2008 Garrison became involved in a controversy involving the granting of an MBA degree to Heather Bresch, who had failed to complete the required credits.  A panel led by WVU faculty members produced a report on the incident described by the Pittsburgh Post-Gazette as criticising the university administration for having made "a 'seriously flawed' decision fraught with favoritism." In May 2008 the faculty senate voted 77-19 to call for Garrison's resignation - a demand repeated by a vote (565-39, with 11 abstentions) open to all WVU faculty at a mass meeting a week later.  In August 2012, West Virginia University officially closed its investigation, reaching no conclusion but foreseeing "unreasonable delays in investigating complaints of misconduct" raised questions about violations of due process rights.

On June 6, 2008, Garrison officially announced he would resign as President of the University effective September 1, 2008. In October 2008 a West Virginia grand jury decided not to indict Garrison on criminal charges relating to the degree scandal.  Some news accounts alleged a friendly relationship between Garrison and the Governor, but the official WVU investigation ended before reaching the same conclusion.

After leaving West Virginia University, Garrison returned to his former law firm, Spilman Thomas & Battle, Garrison's more recent work includes representing natural gas company Northeast Energy in its $42 million suit against the City of Morgantown, West Virginia.  Northeast is seeking an injunction against the city, to prevent enforcement of its recent ban on horizontal hydraulic fracking. Morgantown passed its ban after Northeast sited a drill pad near the city's primary drinking-water intake, and the ban and the issue have received increasing press coverage, both locally  and even nationally.

References

Living people
Year of birth missing (living people)
Presidents of West Virginia University
West Virginia University alumni